Mary Theresa Kelly, née Coolican (1927–2017), was an English writer of crime novels. Born in London, she received an M.A. degree from University of Edinburgh in 1951. She married Dennis Charles Kelly in 1950.

Bibliography

The Inspector Brett Nightingale series
 A Cold Coming (1956)
 Dead Man's Riddle (1957)
 The Christmas Egg (1958)

Other novels
 The Spoilt Kill (1961) (Gold Dagger Award)
 Due to a Death (1962; USA: The Dead of Summer)
 March to the Gallows (1964)
 The Dead Corse (1966)
 Write on Both Sides of the Paper (1969)
 The Twenty-Fifth Hour (1971)
 That Girl in the Alley (1974)

References

1927 births
2017 deaths
Alumni of the University of Edinburgh
English crime fiction writers
English women novelists
20th-century English women writers
20th-century English writers
Women crime fiction writers